Allah Ditta may refer to:

 Allah Ditta (racewalker) (born 1931), Pakistani racewalker
 Allah Ditta (pole vaulter) (1932–2020), Pakistani pole vaulter
 Allah Ditta (wrestler) (born 1947), Pakistani wrestler
 Allah Ditta (hurdler) (born 1977), Pakistani hurdler